John Newlands may refer to:
John Newlands (chemist) (1837–1898), English analytical chemist
John Newlands (Australian politician) (1864–1932), Australian Senator
John Newlands (Canadian politician) (1889–19??), politician in Ontario, Canada

See also
John Newland (disambiguation)